Doullens (former ) is a commune in the Somme department, Hauts-de-France, France.

Its inhabitants are called Doullennais and Doullennaises.

Geography
Doullens is situated on the N25 road, in the northern part of the department, straddling the river Authie,  the border with the Pas-de-Calais.  Doullens is practically mid-way on the intersection of these axes :
 Abbeville - Arras
 Amiens - Saint-Pol-sur-Ternoise
 Crécy-en-Ponthieu - Bapaume
 Auxi-le-Château - Acheux-en-Amiénois

History
 Doullens, the ancient Dulincum, was seat of a viscountship under the counts of Vermandois then of Ponthieu (Hare) and an important stronghold in the Middle Ages.
 In 1225, the town became part of France.
 In 1475 it was burnt by Louis XI for openly siding with the Duke of Burgundy. It received its name Doullens-le-Hardi from its gallant defense in 1523 against the Anglo-Burgundian army. 
 In 1595 it was besieged and occupied by the Spaniards, who massacred the entire population. It was restored to France by the Peace of Vervins (1598).
 On  26  March 1918, orders giving General Foch overall command of the allied forces on the western front were signed in a room in the town hall.  A link to those orders can be found in the May 22, 1928 edition of 'The Times' of London, found here.

Sites and monuments
Sites and monuments include:
 the ruins of Saint-Pierre, partly of the 13th century, used as a barn in the nineteenth century (Hare).
 Notre-Dame church.
 An early 17th century brick belfry. In 2005, the belfry was inscribed on the UNESCO World Heritage List as part of the Belfries of Belgium and France site, because of its architecture and historical testimony to the rise of municipal power in the area. 
 the citadel, possibly built by Vauban or Jean Errard, which has often served as a state prison, and later, a reformatory for girls.

Town motto
Infinita decus lilia mihi prestant

Population

Notable residents
The artist Édouard Traviès was born in Doullens in 1809.
Louis Auguste, Duke of Maine was imprisoned in the Doullens citadel from 1718 until 1720 for his part in the Cellamare conspiracy. 
The nobleman Emmanuel Marie Michel Philippe Fréteau de Saint-Just was imprisoned in the citadel in 1788.

Gallery

See also
Communes of the Somme department

References

 Augustus Hare, North-eastern France 1896:76.

External links

 Official commune site 
 Site of the tourist office 
 Photos 

Communes of Somme (department)
Picardy